Theodoor Christiaan Adriaan (Theo) Colenbrander (31 October 1841 in Doesburg – 28 May 1930 in Laag-Keppel) Dutch architect, ceramist plaque painter, and designer, characterized as the first Dutch industrial designer.

Life and work 
Colenbrander was born in Doesburg, where his father was one of the notables, who worked as commissioner, insurance agent, land agent, and director of the potato flour mill. Beside his regular school, he received additional education from the local city architect. In the late 1850s he started working for the architect L.H. Eberson (1822–1889) in Arnhem, who later became the chief architect for Willem III. He participated in some architectural contests by the Maatschappij tot Bevordering der Bouwkunst, and received some honorable recommendations. In 1867 he moved to Paris where he assisted in the construction of the Dutch pavilion for the World Fair in Paris of 1867.

Back in the Netherlands he settled in The Hague. From 1884 to 1888 he was designer and artistic director at the plaque factory Plateelbakkerij Rozenburg in The Hague. The Gemeentemuseum Den Haag recalls, that "Rozenburg pottery made a particularly important contribution to the transformation of Dutch decorative earthenware. This was due first and foremost to the architect T.A.C. Colenbrander (1841–1930), who designed a completely new and innovative range over the 1885-1889 period. His striking designs featured distinctively irregular shapes and fanciful decorative motifs, generally abstracted from nature and executed in an Expressionist palette."

As designer he subsequently worked in Deventer, Amersfoort, The Hague in the year 1912–13, Oosterbeek (Renkum), and since the 1920s in Arnhem. From 1921 to 1924 he designed work for the Plateelbakkerij Ram, which only produced designs by Colenbrander.

Gallery

Work in public collections (selection) 
 Rijksmuseum Amsterdam
 Princessehof Ceramics Museum
 Museum de Fundatie, Zwolle

See also 
 List of Dutch ceramists

References

Further reading 
 R.W.P. [de Vries] jr, "Nieuw aardewerk van Th.A.C. Colenbrander," Elsevier's Geïllustreerd Maandschrift 23 (1913), p. 439
 R.W.P. [de Vries] jr, "Jubileum-tentoonstelling Th.A.C. Colenbrander te Amsterdam," Elsevier's Geïllustreerd Maandschrift 33 (1923), p. 428-430
 Arno Weltens, Riet Neerincx, Theodorus Christiaan Adriaan Colenbrander, Gemeentemuseum (Arnhem). T.A.C. Colenbrander (1841–1930): Plateelbakkerij 'RAM' te Arnhem (1921–1935). Gemeentemuseum, 1986.
 Arno Weltens, T. A. C. Colenbrander (2008). Theo Colenbrander: tapijten, d'jonge Hond, 2008

External links 

  Theo Colenbrander, 1841-1930, Vernieuwer van de kunstnijverheid

1841 births
1930 deaths
Dutch architects
Dutch ceramists
Dutch designers
People from Doesburg